Paduka Sri Sultan Ahmad Tajuddin Shah ibni Almarhum Sultan Mansur Shah I (died 1584) was the third Sultan of Perak. He was the son of the second Sultan of Perak, Sultan Mansur Shah I.

Reign 
After the news of the death of his father, Sultan Mansur Shah I, the people of Perak went to the Aceh Sultanate and went to see the Sultan. The Sultan of Aceh at that time was Ahmad Tajuddin's older brother and eldest son of the late Sultan Mansur Shah I whose name was Sultan Alauddin Mansur Shah and the people of Perak asked for a prince to be made sultan in Perak. Sultan Alauddin Mansur Shah then agreed and sent his younger brother named Raja Ahmad to be made sultan in Perak who then used the title Sultan Ahmad Tajuddin Shah.

At that time, Perak was still under the control of Aceh, after gaining the throne of the Perak Sultanate, Sultan Ahmad Tajuddin Shah began to reside in a place called Jalong. However, because the area is often flooded, he moved and resided in a new location called Geronggong, which is located in Pulau Tiga subdistrict.

Death 
Sultan Ahmad Tajuddin Shah ruled the Perak for only seven years and died in the year 1584 in Jalong and was given the title Marhum Muda. The Late Sultan Ahmad Tajuddin Shah left behind a son named Raja Inu who was titled Raja Kecil Lasa. About a year after the Sultan of Perak died, his brother, Sultan Alauddin Mansur Shah of Aceh also died.

His mother and his relatives who were taken to Aceh left to return to Perak. Since then, the power of the Aceh Sultanate over Perak began to disappear little by little.

The location of the tomb of Sultan Ahmad Tajuddin Shah is located in Kampung Jawa which is close to Kampung Gajah. Near the mausoleum of Sultan Ahmad Tajuddin Shah there is also the mausoleum of the 11th Sultan of Perak and the mausoleum of the 12th Sultan of Perak.

References 

Sultans of Perak
1584 deaths
Royal House of Perak
Malay people
People of Malay descent
Muslim monarchs
Sultans
Sunni monarchs
People from Perak